Kiskőrös is a district in central part of Bács-Kiskun County. Kiskőrös is also the name of the town where the district seat is found. The district is located in the Southern Great Plain Statistical Region.

Geography 
Kiskőrös District borders with Kunszentmiklós District to the north, Kecskemét District to the northeast, Kiskunfélegyháza District and Kiskunmajsa District to the east, Kiskunhalas District to the southeast, Jánoshalma District to the south, Kalocsa District to the west. The number of the inhabited places in Kiskőrös District is 15.

Municipalities 
The district has 4 towns and 11 villages.
(ordered by population, as of 1 January 2012)

The bolded municipalities are cities.

Demographics

In 2011, it had a population of 54,625 and the population density was 48/km2.

Ethnicity
Besides the Hungarian majority, the main minorities are the German (approx. 1,500), Roma (1,400), Slovak (1,200) and Romanian (400).

Total population (2011 census): 54,625
Ethnic groups (2011 census): Identified themselves: 54,640 persons:
Hungarians: 49,828 (91.19%)
Germans: 1,524 (2.79%)
Gypsies: 1,434 (2.62%)
Slovaks: 1,152 (2.11%)
Others and indefinable: 702 (1.28%)
Approx. 20 persons in Kiskőrös District did declare more than one ethnic group at the 2011 census.

Religion
Religious adherence in the county according to 2011 census:

Catholic – 26,821 (Roman Catholic – 26,734; Greek Catholic – 82);
Evangelical – 8,789;
Reformed – 4,473;
other religions – 1,740; 
Non-religious – 3,716; 
Atheism – 273;
Undeclared – 8,813.

Gallery

See also
List of cities and towns of Hungary

References

External links
 Postal codes of the Kiskőrös District

Districts in Bács-Kiskun County